= Speed limits in Nepal =

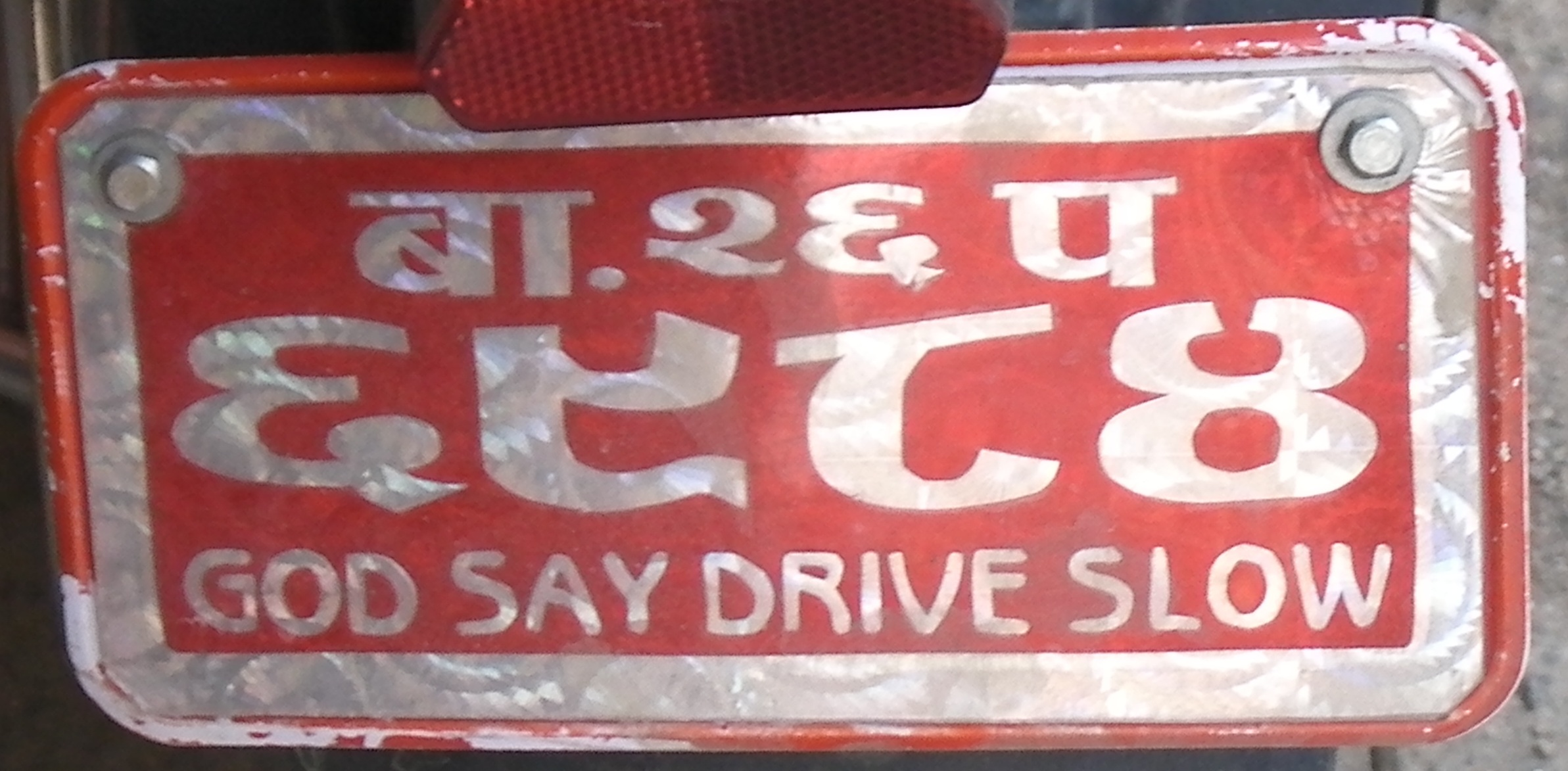
Nepali motorcycle plate

Since 1992 speed zones can be set by the Department of Transport Management under section 115 of the Vehicle & Transportation Act. The speed limit in the nation's capital, Kathmandu, is set to 50km/h.
